Ramón Amaya Amador (April 29, 1916 – November 24, 1966) was a Honduran journalist, author, and political activist, known for his most recognizable works "Prision verde" and "Cipotes".

Biography

Amaya was born in Olanchito in the department of Yoro. After being educated in La Ceiba, he worked on the banana plantations along the Northern Caribbean coast of Honduras. He published his first work in 1939. He became a journalist in 1941 for El Atlántico (The Atlantic), a La Ceiba newspaper. In October 1943 he founded a weekly magazine in Olanchito called Alerta (Alert).

A leading Honduran communist, he moved to Guatemala in 1944 fleeing political persecution, where he worked on the Nuestro Diario (Our Daily) newspaper and was very supportive of the left-wing government of Jacobo Arbenz. In his 10 years in Guatemala he also worked for the Diario de Centro América (Central American Daily), El Popular Progresista (The Popular Progressive) and Medioía (Midday). It was at the beginning of this period that he wrote what is considered his finest novel, Prisión verde (Green prison), which for many years was banned in Honduras, and described life on the banana plantations in the Bajo Aguán valley of northern Honduras, and the consequences of a laborstrike there.

When the Arbenz government fell in June 1954, Amador sought refuge in the Argentine embassy before being granted asylum in  Argentina where he worked for Sarmiento, a popular educational newspaper. While there, he married an Argentinian, Regina Arminda Funes, with whom he returned to Honduras in May 1957. He began working for El Cronista (The Chronicle), and founded the magazine Vistazo (View) in Tegucigalpa. Soon afterwards, he left Honduras with his family and his two small children to move to Prague, Czechoslovakia where he worked on a magazine called Problems of Peace and Socialism until he died at 50 years of age in a plane crash in 1966 in Bratislava, Czechoslovakia. In September 1977 his remains were returned to the Honduran capital Tegucigalpa.

Published books
His son Carlos Amaya Fúnez has worked over many years to promote the work of his father. The dates given indicate when the books were written, not when they were first published. These books have all been published in Spanish though there are almost twenty others which remain unpublished.
Prisión Verde (1945)
Amanecer (1947)
El indio Sánchez (1948)
Bajo el signo de la Paz (1952)
Constructores (1958)
El señor de la sierra (1957)
Los brujos de Ilamatepeque (1958)
Biografía de un machete (1959)
Destacamento Rojo (1960)
El camino de mayo (1963so
Cipotes (1963)
Con la misma herradura (1963)
Jacinta Peralta (1964)
Operación gorila (1965)
Los rebeldes de la villa de San Miguel (1966) (Volume 1 of a 5 volume series called Morazaneida)

References

External links
 Biography in Spanish

1916 births
1966 deaths
Honduran activists
Honduran communists
Honduran journalists
Male journalists
Honduran novelists
Male novelists
Honduran male writers
People from Yoro Department
Honduran emigrants to Guatemala
Honduran emigrants to Czechoslovakia
20th-century novelists
20th-century male writers
20th-century Honduran writers
20th-century journalists
Victims of aviation accidents or incidents in Czechoslovakia
Victims of aviation accidents or incidents in 1966